Lev (lit Heart) was a short-lived political faction in Israel, existing for only several minutes during the 15th Knesset on 6 November 2002.

Background
After Ariel Sharon formed a coalition government with the Centre Party in 2001 following his victory in the special election for Prime Minister, speculation started that Centre Party MK Roni Milo intended to return to Likud. On 22 May 2002 Milo told fellow Centre Party MKs that he wanted to return to Likud and that he wanted them to come with him.

Eventually, on 6 November 2002, just Milo and Yehiel Lasri broke away from Centre Party, briefly forming the Lev faction which merged into Likud after only a few minutes in existence. Three other Centre Party MKs left and formed New Way, which later merged into Labour.

References

External links
Lev Knesset website

Political parties established in 2002
Political parties disestablished in 2002
Defunct political parties in Israel
2002 establishments in Israel
2002 disestablishments in Israel